Mathematics, Form and Function, a book published in 1986 by Springer-Verlag, is a survey of the whole of mathematics, including its origins and deep structure, by the American mathematician Saunders Mac Lane.

Mathematics and human activities
Throughout his book, and especially in chapter I.11, Mac Lane informally discusses how mathematics is grounded in more ordinary concrete and abstract human activities. The following table is adapted from one given on p. 35 of Mac Lane (1986). The rows are very roughly ordered from most to least fundamental. For a bullet list that can be compared and contrasted with this table, see section 3 of Where Mathematics Comes From.

Also see the related diagrams appearing on the following pages of Mac Lane (1986): 149, 184, 306, 408, 416, 422-28.

Mac Lane (1986) cites a related monograph by Lars Gårding (1977).

Mac Lane's relevance to the philosophy of mathematics 
Mac Lane cofounded category theory with Samuel Eilenberg, which enables a unified treatment of mathematical structures and of the relations among them, at the cost of breaking away from their cognitive grounding.  Nevertheless, his views—however informal—are a valuable contribution to the philosophy and anthropology of mathematics. His views anticipate, in some respects, the more detailed account of the cognitive basis of mathematics given by George Lakoff and Rafael E. Núñez in their Where Mathematics Comes From. Lakoff and Núñez argue that mathematics emerges via conceptual metaphors grounded in the human body, its motion through space and time, and in human sense perceptions.

See also 
 1986 in philosophy

Notes

References
Gårding, Lars, 1977. Encounter with Mathematics. Springer-Verlag.
 Reuben Hersh, 1997. What Is Mathematics, Really? Oxford Univ. Press.
George Lakoff and Rafael E. Núñez, 2000. Where Mathematics Comes From. Basic Books.
 
 Leslie White, 1947, "The Locus of Mathematical Reality: An Anthropological Footnote," Philosophy of Science 14: 289-303. Reprinted in Hersh, R., ed., 2006. 18 Unconventional Essays on the Nature of Mathematics. Springer: 304–19.

1986 non-fiction books
Mathematics books
Philosophy of mathematics literature
Cognitive science literature